Thrissur Aquatic Complex is a swimming pool complex situated in Thrissur city of Kerala in India.

History
The complex was built in 1987 in three and half acres of land and was inaugurated by former Kerala Chief Minister K. Karunakaran. Vinod Rai, then Collector of Thrissur District was instrumental in building the aquatic complex. It was the second aquatic complex built in India after the 1982 Asian Games. National Games of 1987 was the first event held in the complex. Race pool, diving pool, indoor practice pool, gymnasium are the other facilities available in the complex.

Events held
 National Games of India: 1987 
 National Aquatic Championships (Organized by Railways): 1991
 All India Inter-Varsity Championships: 1992  
 All India Inter-Varsity Championships: 1994 
 56th Senior National Aquatic Championships: 2002

References

Swimming venues in India
Sports venues in Thrissur
1987 establishments in Kerala
Sports venues completed in 1987
20th-century architecture in India